Neotrombidiidae is a family of velvet mites and chiggers in the  order Trombidiformes. There are at least four genera in Neotrombidiidae.

Genera
These four genera belong to the family Neotrombidiidae:
 Anomalothrombium (André, 1936)
 Discotrombidium Feider, 1977
 Monunguis Wharton, 1938
 Neotrombidium Leonardi, 1901

References

Further reading

External links

 

Trombidiformes
Acari families